Katharine Blake (11 September 1921 – 1 March 1991) was a British actress, born in South Africa with an extensive career in television and films. She was married to director Charles Jarrott. She had two daughters, each by different fathers, Jenny Kastner (Nee Jacobs), with her first husband, actor Anthony Jacobs (father of Martin Jameson, Matthew Jacobs and Amanda Jacobs), and Lindy Greene, with her second husband, actor/director David Greene. She was estranged from both daughters at the time of her death.

Blake won the BAFTA for Best Actress for her work in television in 1964. In 1969/1970 she played the character Chris Nourse in first an episode of Public Eye and then in Armchair Theatre'''s Wednesday's Child; one of the first lesbian love affairs to be seen on UK television. Blake replaced Googie Withers as the Prison Governor in the ITV series Within These Walls in 1977, but only appeared in one season, leaving the role due to ill health.

Selected filmography
 Trottie True (1949) – Ruby Rubarto (uncredited)
 Assassin for Hire (1951) – Maria Riccardi
 The Dark Light (1951) – Linda
 Hunted (1952) – Waitress
 Saturday Island (1952) – Nurse
 Hammer the Toff (1952) – Janet Lord
 Now That April's Here (1958) – Hilda Adams (segment "The Rejected One")
 Edgar Wallace Mysteries (episode: To Have and to Hold) - Claudia  (1963) – (Working Title: BFI: 'Sleep Long, My Love') 
 Anne of the Thousand Days (1969) – Elizabeth Boleyn

Selected television
 1948: Wuthering Heights - Cathy
 1961: The Avengers – Dr. Ampara Alvarez Sandoval
 1962: Sir Francis Drake – The Dark Lady
 1962: Maigret – Mado
 1963: The Saint – Rosemary Chase
 1967: The Baron – Madame Nicharos
 1969: Public Eye – ('My Life's my Own', episode) - Mrs. Chris Nourse (broadcast 20th. Aug., UK)
 1971: Paul Temple – Drucilla Ardrey
 1972: The Shadow of the Tower – Signora Cabot
 1972: No Exit – Claire Dufort
 1959–1973: Armchair Theatre – Sylvia Forsyth / Chris Nourse / Hilary / Marie / Carla Melini / Doris Binstead
 1974: Crown Court – Irene Rutland
 1976: Within These Walls'' – Prison Governess — Helen Forrester

References

External links

1921 births
1991 deaths
20th-century South African actresses
Actresses from Johannesburg
Best Actress BAFTA Award (television) winners
South African emigrants to the United Kingdom
South African film actresses
South African stage actresses
South African television actresses